Francis Stanley Ternent (born 16 June 1946) is an English former footballer and manager. He managed Blackpool, Hull City, Bury, Burnley, Gillingham and Huddersfield Town. He was a scout for Hull City until January 2017. As a manager, he won three promotions between 1996 and 2000, including two in succession (from Division Three to Division One) with Bury. The other came with Burnley in 1999–2000.

Playing career
Born in Gateshead, Ternent signed as an apprentice for Burnley FC, after being spotted by Jack Hixon, the legendary " Scout " who recognised the early talents of Ralph Coates, Trevor Stephen, Steve Bruce and Alan Shearer, amongst others. With Burnley's famed youth policy, Ternent found 1st team opportunities limited, and was transferred to 2nd Tier Carlisle United, where he gained a reputation as a hard tackling midfielder. Carlisle won promotion to the top flight at the end of the 1973–74 season, but Ternent had suffered a serious knee injury earlier that season, and despite an attempted comeback with Sunderland, Ternent was forced to retire having made 188 appearances for Carlisle, aged 28, in the Autumn of 1974.

Managerial career
Upon retiring, he became a coach at Sunderland, firstly, then Blackpool, assisting Bob Stokoe. Ternent himself became manager of the Tangerines in 1979, his first such role, and Blackpool's sixth manager in a decade.

Immediately upon his appointment at Bloomfield Road, Ternent began to reshape the team, spending large sums on new players. Jack Ashurst was purchased from Sunderland for a then-club-record £132,400. Fellow newcomers included Dave Bamber, Colin Morris, Peter Noble and Tom McAlister. Despite the fresh faces, the Seasiders' fortunes didn't improve, and by early 1980 they were in the bottom half of the Third Division. Ternent was sacked on 1 February 1980, at the time becoming the club's shortest-serving manager in their history.

He was part of the coaching staff at Bradford City and served as assistant manager to Steve Coppell at Crystal Palace before his next role as manager came nine years later, at Hull City from 1989 to 1991. He lost his job in January 1991, a few months before the club suffered relegation from the Second Division. From 1991 to 1993 he was assistant manager to Ian Porterfield and then David Webb at Chelsea before again being made redundant.

Ternent was not out of the game for long. He moved from the Premier League to Division Three in a matter of weeks, becoming Mike Walsh's right-hand man at Bury. When Walsh quit in October 1995, Ternent moved up to the manager's seat, and seven months later he took them to Division Two as third-placed team in Division Three. A year later they won the Division Two championship and survived the first season in Division One; however, Ternent left Gigg Lane at the end of the 1997–98 season to take charge of Burnley in Division Two.

Ternent inherited a club in chaos after the ill-fated tenure of Chris Waddle, and a major clearout ensued. Despite a number of heavy defeats, Ternent gained the support of the new owner and Chairman, Barry Kilby, and finished the season with an unbeaten run of 11 games to finish in 15th position. Ternent's second season as Clarets manager, 1999–2000 saw the club finishing as Runners-Up, securing automatic promotion. Over the next two seasons under Ternent, Burnley became an established Championship Club, finishing 7th twice. The next two seasons were rather more disappointing as the collapse of " ITV digital " hit a small town Club's finances, and despite an FA Quarter final in 2003, the club's board did not renew his contract after the 2003–04 campaign. At the end of his final game against Sunderland, an emotional Ternent took a lap of honour around Turf Moor to a standing ovation from the Burnley supporters. Fans and even some players were in tears, as they knew what Burnley meant to Ternent, having joined the Club as an apprentice in June 1963.
 
Ternent made a brief comeback in 2004–05 with Gillingham, taking Ronnie Jepson from Burnley to be his assistant; however, his short-term contract as manager was not renewed, as despite a heroic attempt at survival they were relegated to League One. Ternent quit Gillingham in May 2005.

In November 2007, he was appointed to the backroom staff of new Derby County manager Paul Jewell. He left this role on 24 April 2008 to take up the reins at Huddersfield Town in place of Andy Ritchie, who had been relieved of his duties at the beginning of the month. Ex-Town player Ronnie Jepson, appointed on the same day, became his assistant. He officially started his new job on 28 April, leaving Gerry Murphy in charge of Town's last home game against Walsall on 26 April and their last away game at Luton Town on 3 May.

Backed by a large budget, Ternent signed Keigan Parker, Jim Goodwin, Andy Butler, Chris Lucketti, Michael Flynn, Gary Roberts and David Unsworth during the opening weeks of 2008–09 pre-season. On 4 November, Ternent left the Galpharm Stadium after just over six months in charge of the Terriers. To date, that is the second-shortest reign of any permanent manager in Huddersfield Town's history.

In September 2009 he became a scout for Sunderland.
In September 2012, Ternent was appointed as Chief Recruitment Officer for Hull. He left the club in January 2017, following the sacking of head coach Mike Phelan.

Personal life
In January 2007, Ternent faced assault charges after being accused of headbutting a man at Burnley Cricket Club in August 2006. He was cleared in September 2007. His defence included a statement by Manchester United manager Sir Alex Ferguson.

Managerial statistics

Honours

As a player
Carlisle United
 Division Two promotion: 1973–74

As a manager
Bury
 Division Three promotion: 1995–96
 Division Two: 1996–97

Burnley
 Division Two promotion: 1999–2000

References

Bibliography

External links

1946 births
Living people
Footballers from Gateshead
English footballers
Association football midfielders
Burnley F.C. players
Carlisle United F.C. players
Sunderland A.F.C. players
English Football League players
English football managers
Blackpool F.C. managers
Hull City A.F.C. managers
Bury F.C. managers
Burnley F.C. managers
Gillingham F.C. managers
Derby County F.C. non-playing staff
Huddersfield Town A.F.C. managers
English Football League managers
Bradford City A.F.C. non-playing staff
Crystal Palace F.C. non-playing staff
Sunderland A.F.C. non-playing staff